The Hughes Range is a high massive north–south trending mountain range in Antarctica, surmounted by six prominent summits, of which Mount Kaplan (4,230 m) is the highest. The range is located east of Canyon Glacier in the Queen Maud Mountains and extends  from the confluence of Brandau and Keltie glaciers in the south, to the Giovinco Ice Piedmont in the north.

Discovered and photographed by Rear Admiral Byrd on the baselaying flight of November 18, 1929, and named by the Advisory Committee on Antarctic Names on the recommendation of Byrd for Charles Evans Hughes, U.S. secretary of state, U.S. chief justice, and adviser/counselor of Byrd.

Key mountains
Mount Kaplan
Mount Waterman is a massive mountain, standing  NE of Mount Wexler. The mountain was discovered and photographed by Rear Admiral Byrd on the baselaying flight of November 18, 1929, and surveyed by A.P. Crary from 1957 to 1958. Named by Crary for Alan Tower Waterman, director of the National Science Foundation which directly supported U.S. Antarctic programs during and after the 1957-1958 International Geophysical Year program.
Discovered and photographed by Byrd on the baselaying flight of November 18, 1929, and surveyed by A.P. Crary from 1957 to 1958. Named by Crary for Harry Wexler, chief scientist for U.S. Antarctic during the 1957-1958 International Geophysical Year program.

Features
Geographical features include:

 Alan Tower Waterman
 Campbell Cliffs
 Canyon Glacier
 Good Glacier
 Haynes Table
 Lane Plateau
 Millington Glacier
 Mount Brennan
 Mount Bronk
 Mount Cartwright
 Mount Kaplan
 Mount Odishaw
 Pain Neve
 Perez Glacier
 Shanklin Glacier

References

Queen Maud Mountains
Mountain ranges of the Ross Dependency
Dufek Coast